Ship in Distress (German: Schiff in Not) is a 1925 German silent drama film directed by Fred Sauer and starring Gustav Fröhlich and Jenny Jugo.

The film's sets were designed by the art director Willi Herrmann. It premiered at the Marmorhaus in Berlin.

Cast
 Gustav Fröhlich as Harry Petersen 
 Fritz Alberti as Ludwig Hartner, Reeder  
 Rudolf Del Zopp as der alte Uhl  
 Harry Hardt 
 Jenny Jugo as Blanche Godard  
 Frieda Lehndorf as Mutter Hansen  
 Philipp Manning as Ole Hansen  
 Grete Reinwald as Dörte Hansen  
 Hans Adalbert Schlettow as Pieter Hansen  
 Gyula Szőreghy as Bankier Brandes

References

Bibliography
 Alfred Krautz. International directory of cinematographers, set- and costume designers in film, Volume 4. Saur, 1984.

External links

1925 films
1925 drama films
German drama films
Films of the Weimar Republic
German silent feature films
Films directed by Fred Sauer
Seafaring films
UFA GmbH films
German black-and-white films
Phoebus Film films
Silent drama films
Silent adventure films
1920s German films
1920s German-language films